In the 2015–16 season, ES Sétif competed in the Ligue 1 for the 46th season, as well as the Algerian Cup.

Squad list
Players and squad numbers last updated on 15 August 2015.Note: Flags indicate national team as has been defined under FIFA eligibility rules. Players may hold more than one non-FIFA nationality.

Competitions

Overview

Ligue 1

League table

Results summary

Results by round

Matches

Algerian Cup

Algerian Super Cup

2015 Champions League

Group stage

Group B

2016 Champions League

First round

Second round

Squad information

Playing statistics

|-
! colspan=14 style=background:#dcdcdc; text-align:center| Goalkeepers

|-
! colspan=14 style=background:#dcdcdc; text-align:center| Defenders

|-
! colspan=14 style=background:#dcdcdc; text-align:center| Midfielders

|-
! colspan=14 style=background:#dcdcdc; text-align:center| Forwards

|-
! colspan=14 style=background:#dcdcdc; text-align:center| Players transferred out during the season

Goalscorers

Transfers

In

Out

References

ES Sétif seasons
Algerian football clubs 2015–16 season